Oppeln or Opole may refer to:

Places
 Opole, a city now in southern Poland
 Opole Voivodeship, a voivodeship in Poland
 Duchy of Opole, or Herzogtum Oppeln, duchy of Silesia ruled by the Piast dynasty
 Oppidum Lubaw, an older name for Löbau, a city in Saxony, Germany

People
 Władysław Opolczyk (1332–1401), or Wladyslaw of Opole, Duke of Opole
 Oppeln-Bronikowski, a noble Lusatian family, including:
 Friedrich von Oppeln-Bronikowski (1873–1936), a German writer, translator, biographer, publisher and cultural historian
 Hermann von Oppeln-Bronikowski (1899–1966), a German army officer and Panzer ace